Ingoldsby is a village in Lincolnshire, England.

Ingoldsby may also refer to:

Ingoldsby, Ontario
Ingoldsby baronets

Ingoldsby is a surname:
Denis Ingoldsby – music producer
Richard Ingoldsby (1617–1685) – English politician and regicide
Francis Ingoldsby – 17th-century English politician
George Ingoldsby deceased Member of Parliament
Henry Ingoldsby deceased Member of Parliament
John "Jack" Ingoldsby – deceased professional ice hockey player
Jon Ingoldsby – music engineer, best known for his work on Madonna's Grammy Award-winning album Ray Of Light
Maeve Ingoldsby – playwright, satirist
Pat Ingoldsby – Irish Poet
Thomas Ingoldsby – pen name of Richard Harris Barham, author of The Ingoldsby Legends